Lawrence Edward Walsh (January 8, 1912 – March 19, 2014) was an American lawyer, a United States district judge of the United States District Court for the Southern District of New York and United States Deputy Attorney General who was appointed Independent Counsel in December 1986 to investigate the Iran–Contra affair during the Reagan Administration.

Early life and career

Walsh was born in Port Maitland, Nova Scotia, Canada, the son of Cornelius Edward (1879–1927) and Lila May (Sanders) Walsh. His father was a family doctor and his grandfather was a sea captain. Walsh grew up in Queens, New York, and became a naturalized citizen at the age of 10. He graduated from Flushing High School.

Walsh received his undergraduate degree from Columbia University in 1932 and a law degree from Columbia Law School in 1935. After graduating from law school, he served a varied career in public life, including as special assistant attorney general of Drukman Investigation from 1936 to 1938 and as a deputy assistant district attorney of New York County from 1938 to 1941. After a period in private practice of law in New York City from 1941 to 1943, he served as assistant counsel to New York Governor Thomas E. Dewey from 1943 to 1949 and as Counsel to the Governor from 1950 to 1951. He was a Counsel for the Public Service Commission from 1951 to 1953, and the general counsel and Executive Director of the Waterfront Commission of New York Harbor from 1953 to 1954.

Federal judicial service

Walsh was nominated by President Dwight D. Eisenhower on April 6, 1954, to the United States District Court for the Southern District of New York, to a new seat authorized by 68 Stat. 8. He was confirmed by the United States Senate on April 27, 1954, and received his commission the next day. His service terminated on December 29, 1957, due to his resignation, having served only three and one-half years as a judge.

Later career

After his resignation from the federal bench, Walsh served as Deputy Attorney General in the Eisenhower administration from 1957 to 1960. Thereafter, Walsh resumed the private practice of law in New York City, where he practiced from 1961 to 1981 as a partner at Davis Polk & Wardwell. During this period, he worked on the Bendectin litigation and represented companies such as General Motors and AT&T. In 1969, on the recommendation of his former boss, Secretary of State and former Attorney General William P. Rogers, Walsh was named as an ambassador in the United States Delegation to the Paris Peace Talks in 1969, but held the position for only a short period of time. He served as president of the American Bar Association from 1975 until 1976. In 1981, approaching Davis Polk's mandatory retirement age, Walsh moved his practice to his wife's hometown of Oklahoma City, Oklahoma, where he joined the firm of Crowe & Dunlevy.

Independent Counsel

On December 19, 1986, Walsh was named as the independent counsel in charge of the Iran-Contra investigation. His investigation led to the convictions of both former Assistant to the President for National Security Affairs Vice Admiral John Poindexter and former NSC staffer Lieutenant Colonel Oliver North, though both convictions were subsequently reversed. Walsh also brought an indictment on two counts of perjury and one count of obstruction of justice against former Secretary of Defense Caspar Weinberger in June 1992. That September, one count, obstruction of justice, was dismissed.

On the eve of the 1992 presidential election, on October 30, Walsh obtained a grand jury re-indictment of Weinberger on one count of false statements. One phrase in that superseding indictment referred to President George H. W. Bush. Some believe that Bush had been closing the gap with Bill Clinton, and that this event stopped his momentum. Clinton administration attorney Lanny Davis called the decision to indict a week before the election rather than after the election "bizarre." Judge Thomas F. Hogan dismissed the October indictment two months later for being outside the statute of limitations. Weinberger's subsequent pardon by President George H. W. Bush in December 1992 preempted any trial. Walsh steadfastly denied that the investigation was politically motivated, while Bush and others criticized it as "the criminalization of policy differences."

Walsh submitted his final report on August 4, 1993, and later wrote an account of his experiences as counsel, Firewall: The Iran-Contra Conspiracy and Cover-Up.  In 2003, Walsh published his autobiography, The Gift of Insecurity:  A Lawyer's Life.

Walsh was the model for the hero of Jacob Appel's novel, The Biology of Luck (2013).  Walsh described having a fictional character based upon him as "flattering" during an August 2013 interview.

Personal life and death

In his senior year of college, Walsh began to date Maxine Winton of Tampa, Florida, a former Barnard College student then attending Columbia Business School. They were married from 1936 until her death from cancer, at age 52, in 1964. In 1965, Walsh married Mary Alma Porter; they were married until her death on December 22, 2012. He was the father of five children — Barbara, Janet, Dale, Sara and Elizabeth.

On January 8, 2012, Walsh celebrated his 100th birthday. On March 19, 2014, Walsh died at the age of 102 in Oklahoma City.

See also
 List of centenarians (jurists and practitioners of law)

References

Sources
 
 Final Report of the Independent Counsel for Iran/Contra Matters
 
Walsh, a Democrat who often served under Republicans, is no stranger to controversy.

External links 
 Finding aid to the Lawrence E. Walsh Papers at Columbia University. Rare Book & Manuscript Library

|-

1912 births
2014 deaths
20th-century American judges
American centenarians
Canadian emigrants to the United States
Canadian centenarians
Columbia College (New York) alumni
Columbia Law School alumni
Davis Polk & Wardwell lawyers
Flushing High School alumni
Judges of the United States District Court for the Southern District of New York
Lawyers from New York City
Lawyers from Oklahoma City
Men centenarians
Naturalized citizens of the United States
People from Yarmouth County
United States Deputy Attorneys General
United States district court judges appointed by Dwight D. Eisenhower